Doris Ziegler (born 14 March 1949) is a German painter whose work responded to and engaged with the Wende and the peaceful revolution in the GDR during the late 1980s.

Life 
Ziegler was born in Weimar, Thuringia, Germany and studied painting at the School of Visual Arts/Academy of Fine Arts Leipzig from 1969 to 1974 under Werner Tübke und Wolfgang Mattheuer. From 1972 to 1981 she was married to the painter . The marriage brought forth a son (born 1977). In 1989 she was an assistant in the Painting department at the School of Visual Arts/Academy of Fine Arts Leipzig. From 1993 to 2014 she served as a professor at the school. Doris Ziegler lives in Leipzig.

Work 
The first figurative paintings emerged in the former GDR during the 1970s. Ziegler mainly focused on portraits and cityscapes. Triggered by her mother's disorder, between 1999 and 2005 she focused on the situations of Alzheimer's patients who were required to spend the end of their lives in a retirement home.

At the end of the 1980s, Ziegler's paintings dealt with demonstrations and crowds, such as Passage 1 (1988, Oil on canvas, 160 x 175 cm) or Aufbruch Straße (1989, Oil on canvas, 120 x 130 cm), which were created in the time of upheaval leading up to the Fall of the Berlin Wall. Her series "Passage pictures" between the years 1988 and 1993 addressed the Wende and the peaceful revolution in the GDR as well as the upheaval in Leipzig. The picture cycle has been included in the exhibition Point of no Return: Transformation and Revolution in East German Art since July 2019 in the Museum of Fine Arts  in the room dedicated to Leipzig.

Solo exhibitions 

 1983 Doris Ziegler, Kleine Galerie Süd, Leipzig
 1990 Doris Ziegler, Galerie Junge Kunst, Frankfurt/Oder
 1990 Doris Ziegler. Von Leipzig bis Amsterdam, Ludwiggalerie Schloss Oberhausen
 1991 Doris Ziegler, Ausstellungszentrum der Universität Leipzig im Kroch-Haus, Leipzig
 1992 Doris Ziegler, Bayerische Vereinsbank, München
 1997 Doris Ziegler, Bayerische Vereinsbank, München
 2000 Doris Ziegler. Stillleben, Kunstverein Panitzsch
 2000 Doris Ziegler, Frauenmuseum, Bonn
 2005 Doris Ziegler. Augenlust, Galerie Kunstantin, Herne
 2006 Doris Ziegler, Kunstverein Südsauerland, Olpe
 2007 Doris Ziegler, Galerie CasArte, Aschaffenburg
 2006 Doris Ziegler, Galerie für zeitgenössische Kunst, Leipzig
 2010 Doris Ziegler. Trockendock, Galerie Irrgang Leipzig
 2012 Doris Ziegler. Lebensarchitektur, Schloss Burgk, Saale
 2016 Doris Ziegler. Am Kanal, Galerie Irrgang, Leipzig
 2018 Doris Ziegler. Lange Abschiede, Brandenburgisches Landesmuseum für moderne Kunst, Frankfurt/Oder

Group exhibitions (selection) 

 1988 Biennale Venedig
 1989 Junge Malerei der 80er Jahre aus der DDR, Solothurn/Schweiz
 1989 Konturen, Neue Nationalgalerie, Berlin
 1992 Zwischen Expressivität und Sachlichkeit, Frauenmuseum, Bonn
 1997 Lust und Last. Leipziger Kunst nach 1945, Museum der bildenden Künste, Leipzig; Germanisches Nationalmuseum, Nürnberg
 2000 Gabriele Münter Preis, Frauenmuseum, Bonn
 2007 Seit Leipzig, Gut Conow, Wittenhagen
 2009 Nicht ohne uns. Ausstellung an vier Orten zur nonkonformen Kunst in der DDR, Dresden
 2009 Landschaft Galerie Irrgang, Leipzig
 2010 Gender Check, Mumok, Wien
 2011 Entdeckt. Rebellische Künstlerinnen der DDR, Kunsthalle Mannheim
 2015 Mit Tübke am Strand. Leipziger Maler in Ahrenshoop, Kunstmuseum Ahrenshoop
 2015 Object is Mediation and Poetry, Grassimuseum, Leipzig
 2016 Palau-Gefühl, Galerie Irrgang Berlin
 2016 Die wilden 80er Jahre in der deutsch-deutschen Malerei, Potsdam Museum
 2019 Point of no Return. Wende und Umbruch in der Ostdeutschen Kunst, Museum der bildenden Künste, Leipzig

Literature (selection) 

 Contours. Works by GDR Artists born in 1949. Exhibition on the occasion of the 40th anniversary of the founding of the GDR. National Gallery from October 5 to December 3, 1989. State Museum Berlin, 1989.
 Rudolf Hiller von Gaertringen, Frank Zöllner, A Matter of Opinion. Leipzig Painters and their City, Passage-Verlag, Leipzig 2015, .
 Point of no Return. Wende und Umbruch in der Ostdeutschen Kunst, hrsg. von Alfred Weidinger, Paul Kaiser und Christoph Tannert, Hirmer Verlag München 2019, .
Book in German: https://www.amazon.de/-/en/Paul-Kaiser/dp/3000663355Hardcover – Illustrated, 11 Nov. 2020 by Paul Kaiser (Herausgeber, Autor), Doris Ziegler (Autor), Thomas Bille (Autor), Ina Gille (Autor), Eckhart Gillen (Autor), Claudia Petzold (Autor), Judith Hoffmann (Autor), April Eisman (Autor), Katrin Arrieta (Autor), Ulrike Kremeier (Autor), Katrin Kunert (Autor), Annika Michalski (Autor), Meinhard Michael (Autor), Ingeborg Ruthe (Autor), Dietulf Sander (Autor), Ines Thate-Keler (Autor)

References

External links 
 Artist's website
 Biography of Doris Ziegler in De Gruyter, on August 2, 2019
 short bio auf whoswho.de
 Doris Ziegler auf artnet.de

1949 births
Living people
20th-century German women artists
21st-century German women artists
German women painters
Artists from Weimar
German portrait painters
German landscape painters
Academic staff of the Hochschule für Grafik und Buchkunst Leipzig